Meinong District (WG: Meinung, Hakka: 瀰濃 Mî-nùng) is a Hakka district in Kaohsiung, Taiwan. Meinong is one of the four districts in Kaohsiung that is the central focus of Hakka cultural development, the others being Jiasian District, Shanlin District, and Liouguei District. In March 2012, it was named one of the "Top 10 Small Tourist Towns" by the Tourism Bureau.

Name
During Japanese rule, the name was changed from "Mî-nùng" (瀰濃/彌濃) to  Mino . "Mî-nùng" may have come from the name of a local aboriginal tribe, "Malang".

History
After the handover of Taiwan from Japan to the Republic of China in 1945, Meinong was organized as an urban township of Kaohsiung County. On 25 December 2010, Kaohsiung County was merged with Kaohsiung City and Meinong was upgraded to a district of the city.

Geography

Area: 120.0316 km2.
Population: 37,344 (January 2023)
Postal Code: 843 
Households: 14,480

Administrative divisions
The district is divided into 19 urban villages and 389 neighborhoods. Villages in the district are Fu'an, Gehe, Luxing, Zhongtan, Dexing, Longshan, Shishan, Longdu, Guangde, Xinglong, Zhongzun, Tungmen, Taian, Minong, Qingshui, Jiyang, Jihe, Jitung and Guanglin Village.

Economy
The area has grown tobacco since 1630 and is renowned nationwide for its oil paper umbrellas. These oil paper umbrellas are made mainly by the Hakka population and exported to Japan.

Education
 Kaomei College of Health Care and Management
There is one senior high school in Meinong District, which is Kaohsiung Private Qimei Senior Commercial and Industrial Vocational School ; three national middle schools, namely Kaohsiung Meinong National Middle School , Kaohsiung City Nanlong National Middle School , Kaohsiung City Longdu National Middle School ; nine National Primary Schools There are Meinong National Elementary School in Meinong District , Kaohsiung City, Jidong National Elementary School in Meinong District , Kaohsiung City, Dongmen National Elementary School in Meinong District , Kaohsiung City, Guangxing National Elementary School in Meinong District , Kaohsiung City, Longdu National Elementary School in Meinong District , Kaohsiung City, and Meinong City, Kaohsiung City . District Zhongtan National Primary School , Kaohsiung City Meinong District Jiyang National Primary School , Kaohsiung City Meinong District Fu'an National Primary School , Kaohsiung City Meinong District Longshan National Primary School .

Infrastructure
 Jhumen Power Plant

Tourist attractions
 Chung Li-ho Museum
 God of Earth
 Guangshan Temple (美濃廣善堂)
 Jhaoyuan Buddhist Temple (朝元寺)
 Jhong Lihe Memorial Institute and Footpath of Taiwanese Literature
 Lin Chun-yu Gatehouse
 Literature Pavilion
 Meinong Cultural and Creative Center
 Meinong East Gate Tower
 Meinong Folk Village
 Meinong Hakka Culture Museum
 Meinong Lake
 Mount Jian
 Mount Ling
 Mount Yueguang
 Shuangsi Tropical Viviparous Forest
 Siajhuang Bridge
 Tobacco Towers
 Tseng Wen-chung Fine Arts Museum
 Word-worshipping Paper Incinerator
 Yellow Butterfly Valley
 Yong-an Old Street
 Yuan Siang Yuan Paper Umbrella Culture Village

Notable natives
 Zhong Lihe, Hakka fiction writer of international importance (See Chung Li-ho) (1915-1960) 
Lin Shengxiang 林生祥, social-environmental activist, globally important (Hakka) folk-rock-fusion singer-songwriter
Lee Yung-te, Minister of Culture
 Lin Hsiang-nung, Minister of the Council of Agriculture (1999–2000)
 Wu Chin-fa, vice chairman of the Council of Cultural Affairs (2004–2008)
 Yang Hung-duen, Minister of Science and Technology (2016–2017)

See also
 Kaohsiung

References

External links

 

Districts of Kaohsiung